Ryo Watanabe may refer to:

, Japanese football player
, Japanese football player